Arthur Edward Cogswell (1858, Peterborough – 1934, Portsmouth) was an English architect, particularly active in the Portsmouth area. He was an architect who, although not well known nationally, left a strong mark on the appearance of Portsmouth lasting until this day.

Career

Cogswell, the Peterborough-born son of a wood carver, arrived in Portsmouth in the early 1870s and served an apprenticeship with a prominent local architect, George Rake (1829–1885), with whom he worked on the new gaol in Kingston (the former HM Prison Kingston) and Milton Lunatic Asylum (now St James' Hospital). After serving his apprenticeship, Cogswell later became a partner in Rake's business, becoming known as Rake and Cogswell. George Rake died in November 1885, and Cogswell continued the business.

In 1888, Cogswell registered as a Member of the Society of Architects and received his first public commission at Portsmouth's Kingston Cemetery, where Cogswell designed "a new Caretaker's Lodge, Entrance Gate and railings" at the cemetery's northern entrance at New Road, which was opened in 1891.

Arthur Cogswell built a reputation of his own and was a friend of John Brickwood, a fellow Freemason who commissioned him to design many of the Brickwood's public houses in the Portsmouth area. He was also responsible for local shops, banks, churches, schools, cinemas, theatres and, in the early 1900s, the Carnegie Library in Fratton Road to which he gave his services for free. His style is very recognisable throughout the city.

Cogswell designed two cinemas in Portsmouth, the New Classic Cinema and the Palace Cinema, and the Gaiety Cinema in Gosport, all of which have since closed.

He designed over twenty pubs in Portsmouth, including The Talbot at 207 Goldsmith Avenue, Southsea built in 1896 for Brickwood's brewery in Brewer's Tudor style, and the Grade II listed The Tangier, 61/63 Tangier Road, Baffins built in 1912 for Portsmouth United Breweries. Cogswell is also credited for designing the early Fratton Park stadium buildings for Portsmouth F.C.

During his career, Cogswell also served with various volunteer regiments of the British Army Reserve. He was a captain in the 2nd Hampshire Royal Garrison Artillery Volunteers, and later served with the Artists Rifles during World War I.

Arthur Edward Cogswell died at the age of 76 in early October 1934, receiving only a 75-word obituary notice in the Portsmouth Evening News, which named him as a "Doyen of City architects" and a "Great Sportsman", but yet received no such recognition from national architectural or trade publications – despite his membership of the Society of Architects. Cogswell's two sons, Victor Cogswell and Douglas Cogswell, carried on the family business, AE Cogswell & Sons, which rebuilt Clarence Pier, Southsea in 1961.

Portsmouth football connections

Cogswell was an enthusiast of association football and founded Portsmouth Association Football Club, an amateur football team which had Sherlock Holmes creator, Arthur Conan Doyle as their goalkeeper, who played under the pseudonym A.C. Smith.

Portsmouth AFC were disbanded in 1896. Although only speculation, many have theorised that Cogswell, a football enthusiast and acquaintance of Brickwood Brewery owner John Brickwood (through his career as a pub architect), may have influenced Brickwood to form a new football club. Brickwood became the chairman of the syndicate which formed Portsmouth Football Club on 5 April 1898.

In 1899, Cogswell designed Fratton Park's first South Stand, called The Grand Stand, which measured "100 feet long with seven rows of seats on the south side" and was built on the southern side of the pitch.

In 1900, Cogswell built a Brickwoods Brewery public house named "The Pompey" next to Fratton Park at 44 Frogmore Road. The owner of the Brickwoods Brewery was John Brickwood, the first chairman of Portsmouth F.C.

In 1905, Cogswell built a mock Tudor club pavilion in the south west corner of Fratton Park which served as the Portsmouth F.C. club offices and players dressing rooms. The pavilion originally featured a tall clock tower spire and a spectator gallery.

Sadly, in 1925 the original Grand Stand and part of the club pavilion (including its clock tower) were cleared to allow space for a new, larger South Stand built by Archibald Leitch, but the distinctive mock Tudor entrance façade of the pavilion still exists in Frogmore Road today.

References

External links

1858 births
1934 deaths
Architects from Cambridgeshire
People from Peterborough
Architects from Portsmouth
Artists' Rifles soldiers
Public house architects